Coro TV is a Venezuelan community television channel.  It was created in July 2004 and can be seen in the community of Santa Ana de Coro in the Miranda Municipality of the Falcón State of Venezuela on UHF channel 68. Victor Gonzalez is the legal representative of the foundation that owns this channel.

Coro TV does not have a website.

See also
List of television networks in Venezuela

Television networks in Venezuela
Television stations in Venezuela
Television channels and stations established in 2004
2004 establishments in Venezuela
Television in Venezuela
Spanish-language television stations